Vazmi (also Romanized as Vazmī) is a village in Khoshabar Rural District, in the Central District of Rezvanshahr County, Gilan Province, Iran. At the 2006 census, its population was 28, in 6 families.

References 

Populated places in Rezvanshahr County